Sugii (written: 杉井 lit. "Japanese cedar well") is a Japanese surname. Notable people with the surname include:

, Japanese anime director and artist
, Japanese footballer
, Japanese writer

Japanese-language surnames